The spoon-snouted catfish (Nedystoma novaeguineae) is a species of catfish in the family Ariidae. It was described by Max Carl Wilhelm Weber in 1913, originally under the genus Doiichthys. It inhabits brackish and freshwaters in central-southern New Guinea.

References

Ariidae
Fish described in 1913